The 104th Street station (signed as 104th Street–Oxford Avenue station) is a station on the IND Fulton Street Line of the New York City Subway, located on Liberty Avenue at 104th Street in Ozone Park, Queens. The station is served by the Lefferts Boulevard branch of the A train at all times.

History

104th Street was one of the six stations along Liberty Avenue in Queens, from 80th Street through Ozone Park–Lefferts Boulevard, as well as the current three track elevated structure, built for the BMT Fulton Street Line in 1915 as part of BMT's portion of the Dual Contracts. The connection to the BMT was severed on April 26, 1956, and the IND was extended east (railroad south) from Euclid Avenue via a connecting tunnel and new intermediate station at Grant Avenue, with the new service beginning on April 29, 1956. The Fulton Street Elevated west of Hudson Street was closed, and eventually demolished.

The station has gone by a number of different names. It opened as Oxford Avenue. A 1924 system map portrayed the station as "Oxford Avenue", with "104th St." shown below the name in parentheses, and in a smaller print. By 1948, "Oxford" and "104" were shown in equal sizes, and by 1959 the name was shown as "104 St–Oxford". The current official map shows the name as just "104 St". Station signage still shows "104th Street – Oxford Avenue".

The station was completely renovated in 2014.

Station layout

The station has three tracks and two side platforms. The middle track is not currently used in revenue service. Northwest of the station, there is a view of the abandoned LIRR's Rockaway Beach Branch tracks from the IND Rockaway Line.

After the station was renovated in 2014 and the beginning of 2015, artwork commissioned by MTA Arts & Design and designed by Béatrice Coron was installed, titled On the Right Track.

Exits
The exit at the northeastern end of the station (railroad south) leads to either eastern corner of Liberty Avenue and 104th Street. At the opposite end of the station there is an exit to either western corner of Liberty Avenue and 102nd Street. These exits were closed due to security concerns but were reopened following the station's renovation from 2014 to 2015.

References

External links 

 104th Street entrance from Google Maps Street View
 Platforms from Google Maps Street View

IND Fulton Street Line stations
BMT Fulton Street Line stations
New York City Subway stations in Queens, New York
Railway stations in the United States opened in 1915
Richmond Hill, Queens
1915 establishments in New York City
Ozone Park, Queens